The  NIFTY 50 is a benchmark Indian stock market index that represents the weighted average of 50 of the largest Indian companies listed on the National Stock Exchange.

Nifty 50 is owned and managed by NSE Indices (previously known as India Index Services & Products Limited), which is a wholly owned subsidiary of the NSE Strategic Investment Corporation Limited. NSE Indices had a marketing and licensing agreement with Standard & Poor's for co-branding equity indices until 2013. The Nifty 50 index was launched on 22 April 1996, and is one of the many stock indices of Nifty.

The NIFTY 50 index has shaped up to be the largest single financial product in India, with an ecosystem consisting of exchange-traded funds (onshore and offshore), and futures and options at NSE and SGX. NIFTY 50 is the world's most actively traded contract. WFE, IOM and FIA surveys endorse NSE's leadership position.  Between 2008 & 2012, the NIFTY 50 index's share of NSE market fell from 65% to 29% due to the rise of sectoral indices like NIFTY Bank, NIFTY IT, NIFTY Pharma, and NIFTY Next 50.

The NIFTY 50 index covers 13 sectors of the Indian economy and offers investment managers exposure to the Indian market in one portfolio. As of January 2023, NIFTY 50 gives a weightage of 36.81% to financial services including banking, 14.70% to IT, 12.17% to oil and gas, 9.02% to consumer goods, and 5.84% to automobiles.

Methodology
The NIFTY 50 index is a free float market capitalisation weighted index. The index was initially calculated on a full market capitalisation methodology. On 26 June 2009, the computation was changed to a free-float methodology. The base period for the NIFTY 50 index is 3 November 1995, which marked the completion of one year of operations of the equity market segment on NSE. The base value of the index has been set at 1000 and a base capital of ₹ 2.06 trillion.

Record values

Constituents

Index changes
Changes in index constituents since Nifty 50 adopted free float criteria in 2009:

Major single day falls

Following are some of the notable single-day falls of the NIFTY 50 Index.

Major single day gains

Following are some of the notable single-day gains of the NIFTY 50 Index.

Annual returns 
The following table shows the annual development of the NIFTY 50 since 2000. The historical daily returns data can be accessed from the NSE website.

Derivatives
Trading in futures and options on the NIFTY 50 is offered by the NSE and SGX. NSE offers weekly as well as monthly expiry options. It is the second most traded index option in the world after nifty bank

NIFTY Next 50

NIFTY Next 50, also called NIFTY Junior, is an index of 50 companies whose free float market capitalisation comes after that of the companies in NIFTY 50. NIFTY Next 50 constituents are thus potential candidates for future inclusion in NIFTY 50.

See also
 NSE Indices
 BSE SENSEX
 National Stock Exchange of India
 Bombay Stock Exchange

References

External links
 Bloomberg page for NIFTY:IND
NSE official site

Indian stock market indices
National Stock Exchange of India
1996 establishments in Maharashtra